Mahaprasad is the term applied to the 56 food items offered to Lord Jagannath in the holy Temple of Puri, located in Odisha, India. The Bhog/Naivedya offered to him and later to Maa Bimala in the Grand Temple (Sri Mandir) and remains of that Nivedana (after accepting by the God) is known as ‘Mahaprasad’. Mahaprasad is also widely named as the famous Chappan Bhog.

Mahaprasad and Meaning
Mahaprasad is of two types. One is Sankudi mahaprasad and the other is Sukhila mahaprasad. Both the types are available for sale in Ananda Bazaar of the Grand Temple.

Sankudi mahaprasad includes items like rice, ghee rice, mixed rice, cumin seed and asaphoetida-ginger rice mixed with salt, and dishes like sweet dal, plain dal mixed with vegetables, mixed curries of different types, Saaga Bhaja', Khatta, porridge etc. All these are offered to the Lord in ritualistic ways. It is said that every day 56 types of Prasad are offered to the Lord during the time of worship and all of these are prepared in the kitchens of the temple and sold to the devotees in Ananda Bazaar by the Suaras who are the makers of the Prasad.
 Shukhila mahaprasad consists of dry sweetmeals.

Besides Sankudi and Shukhila mahaprasad another type of dry mahaprasad is Nirmalya. This is also known as Kaibalya. In spiritual recognition Nirmalya is equally important as Mahaprasad. There is a belief among Hindus that if Nirmalya is given to a person on his death bed, he is certain to find a place for himself in the heaven after his death following atonement of all his sins. Nirmalya is commonly understood as dry-rice i.e. rice dried up in hot sun in Kaibalya Baikuntha. As laid down in the Skanda Purana things like flowers, sandal paste, garlands, etc. which are treated with reverence on the Lord including the other divine deities seated on Ratnasinmhasan (throne) in the temple are also known as Nirmalya after they are taken out from the deities. It is thus established that any of the divine accompaniments or components that is taken out of the Lord and his divine associates is known as Nirmalya.

Four hallowed shrines located at cardinal points of the Indian sub-continent i.e. Puri, Rameswar, Dwarika and Badrinath are believed to have been liked by Lord Vishnu intimately. It is said and believed that He takes His bath at Rameswaram, meditates at Badrinath, dines at Puri and retires at Dwarika. Hence, the temple food “Mahaprasad” (not simply prasad) at Puri is held to be of supreme importance.

According to "Skanda Purana" Lord Jagannath redeems the devotees by permitting them to partake His Mahaprasad, to have His darshan and to worship Him by observing rituals and by offering of gifts. Mahaprasad is treated here as 'Anna Brahma'. The temple kitchen has got the capacity to cook for a lakh of devotees on a day. Mahaprasad is cooked only in earthen pots and using fire wood as fuel. The steam-cooked food is offered to Lord Jagannath first and then to Bimalaa Debi after which it becomes Mahaprasad. This Mahaprasad is freely partaken by people of all castes and creeds without any discrimination. The items offered include cooked rice, dal, vegetable curry, sweet-dishes, cakes etc. Dry confectioneries are prepared of sugar, gur, wheat flour, ghee, milk and cheese (Chenna) etc.

Legend has it that when the steam cooked food is carried to the Lord in slings of earthen pots no essence can be smelled from the food but when the same is carried back to the sale point (Anand Bazar) after being offered to the Lord, a delicious smell spreads along in the breeze to the pleasant surprise of the devotees. Now the food is blessed.

Mahaprasad consolidates human bond, sanctifies, sacraments and grooms the departing soul for its journey upwards.

Mahaprasad are sold in Anand Bazar or the Happiness Mart of the temple which is situated on the north east corner of the outer enclosure of the temple. It is the biggest open-air hotel in the world where every day thousands of devotees purchase and eat together.

Most of the residents in and around Puri depend upon this Mahaprasad to entertain their guests during social functions such as thread ceremony and weddings. In all auspicious occasions in Odia Hindu families, Mahaprasad is partaken first.

The tourists prefer to carry a particular type of dry Mahaprasad known as "Khaja" (made of maida, sugar and ghee) which stays fresh for days together.

Mahaprasad is ceased to be offered from the first day of the Ratha Yatra till the day the deities return to their bejeweled throne.

Dried rice Mahaprasad known as “Nirmalya” is also used by devotees and tourists for different sacred occasions.

Daily food offerings

There are six particular times a day, starting from early morning, when different kinds of Pitha, vegetables, rice and dal are offered to Jagannath and his sibling deities. Locally the offerings are called Dhupa when offered through  Sodasa (16) Upchars and Bhoga when offered through pancha upacharas.

The most popular is the midday Naivedhya, which contains the maximum number of food items. The items are not cooked by any human beings, but rather the ingredients are put in earthen vessels and kept on a wooden fire. After time has passed, the items are taken away from fire and taken by supakaras to the Sanctum sanctorum or Garbhagriha for offering. The naivedhya is thereafter offered to the sibling deities that is again offered to Bimalaa, a form of Shakti. Then the prasad becomes Mahaprasad and people partake the mahaprasad.

When the Sun stays in the zodiac Dhanu, during that time an additional naivedhya is given before sunrise which is called Pahili Bhoga.

Daily offerings to the Lord include:
 Gopala Vallabha Bhoga: The first offering to the Lord in the morning that forms his breakfast. 
 Sakala Dhupa: The Sakala Dhupa forms his next offering at about 10 O’ clock in the morning. This generally consists of 13 items including the Enduri cake and Mantha puli.
 Bhoga mandapa bhoga: The next repast and the offering consists of Pakhala with dahi and Kanji payas. The offerings are made in the bhog mandapa, about 200 feet from the Ratna Vedi. This is called Chatra Bhog and was introduced by Adi Shankaracharya in the 8th century to help pilgrims share the temple food.
 The Madhyanha dhupa forms the next offering at the noon.
 Sandhya Dhupa: This offering to the Lord is made in the evening at around 8 o’clock. 
 Bada Simhara Bhoga: The last offering to the Lord.

Except Gopal Ballav Bhog and Bhog Mandap all other 4 bhogs are offered near the Ratnabedi inside the frame of Phokaria which is being drawn by the Puja pandas using Muruj. The items that form the core of offerings to Lord Jagannath’s Mahaprasad are:

Gopal Ballabha Bhog (Breakfast at 8.30 am)
The offering is the first one of the daily Prasad to Lord Jagannath. The Bhogs are offered at the Anabsar Pindi. Breakfast is a seven item treat - Khua (Condensed milk), Lahuni (Butter), Nadia Kora (grated sweet coconut), coconut water, Khai (rice puffs sweetened with sugar) and Dahi (curd), and Pachila Kadali (ripe bananas).

 Ballabha Khai - 44 Oli
 Pachila Kadali (Ripe Banana) - 7 Nos
 Nadia Khudi - 3 Sara
 Big Kora - 29 Nos
 Small Kora - 220 Nos
    
Members of Sevayats conduct this Puja in 5 Upchars. The sevayats who conduct this ritual are Puja Panda, Sudha Suar, Ballabh Jogania, Suar Badu, Gara Badu, Palia Maha Suar. In the month of Dhanu Sankranti, Ballabh Bhog is offered along with Pahali Bhog. Similarly on the DolaPurnima and Snana Purnima days, the Ballav Bhog and Sakal Dhup are taken up at one time. During Anabasar the Bhogs are offered near Jay-Vijay door as Sarpamanohi, but not on ballav pindi.

Sakala Dhupa (Morning meal at 10.00 am)
This is the first cooked meal Bhog. This bhoga is also called 'Kotha bhoga' or 'Raja bhoga'   The Sevaks offer this Bhoga with 16 Upchars on sitting on Ratnavedi. The following items are offered as Bhog for the purpose.

 Pithapuli - 4 Sara
 Badakanti - 5 Sara
 Enduri - 6 Nos cut in to 12 pieces
 Matha Puli - 6 Nos
 Dahi Amlu & Gray - 1 Sara
 Hanskeli - 2 Sara
 Sanakanti - 3 Sara
 Chand for Puja Panda - 9
 Kakatua Jhilli - 4 Nos
 Ada Pachedi - 4 Sara
 Bundia - 1 Sara
 Khechudi - 3 Kudia
 Kanika - 3 Kudia
 Nukhura Khechudi - 4
 Sana Khechudi -8 Oli
 Mendha Mundia - 1 No
 Adha Kania - 2 Kudia
 Taila Khechudi - 14 Kudia
 Saaga - 5 Oli
 Majuri Khechudi - 3 Kudia
 Dala Khechudi

Bhoga Mandapa Bhoga (Supplementary to breakfast at 11.00 am)
As per the demand of the devotees, the Bhogs are sold for a fee.

Madhyanna Dhupa (Midday meal at 12.30 to 1.00 pm)
Like the Sakal Dhup, this is also performed in 16 Upchars. The Sevayats engaged for the Sakala Dhupa are only allowed for Madhyana Dhupa and Sandhya Dhupa. Generally different types of sweet cakes are offered during this Puja. The Bhogs used for this purpose is as follows:

 Bada Pitha - 4 Sara
 Bada Arisa - 18 Nos
 Matha Puli - 17 Nos
 Bada Bada - 9 Nos
 Sana Kakara - 4 Sara
 Jhadei Naada - 2 Oli
 Suar Manohar - 30
 Bada Khairachula - 1
 Bada Puspalak Arisa - 10
 Gaja - 1 Oli (24 Nos)
 Paga Arisa - 9
 Biri Badi - 4 Oli
 Thali Anna for Subhadra - 3 Kudua
 Thali Anna for Jagannath- 4 Kudua
 Sana Oli Oria - 4 Oli
 Muga Dali - 4 Oli
 Sana Oli Marichi Pani - 4 Oli
 Sana Kadamba - 5 Oli
 Bada Khirisa - 1 Oli
 Subas Pakhala - 11 Oli
 Chhena Pishta - 2 Sara
 Sakara - 2 Oli
 Sana Oli Bada Khirisa - 4 Oli
 Panaka - 5 Oli
 Kadamba Handi - 3 Nos
 Bada Oli Marichi Pani - 4 Oli
 Pita Anna - 4 Oli
 Bhog Odia Bada - 10 Oli
 Thali Anna for Sudarsan Chakra- 2 Kudua
 Balabhadra Thali Anna - 9 Kudua
 Jhnada Tada - 1
 Boak Arisa - 6
 Marichi Ladu - 50
 Sana Khairachula - 4
 Thali Paka Dhaula - 9
 Manohar - 8
 Jhadeinada Gula - 10 Nos
 Bada Kakara - 9 Nos
 Sana Arisa - 21 Nos
 Tripuri - 5 Sara

Sandhya Dhupa (Evening meal at 7.00 to 8.00 pm)
After the evening Arati, Sandhya Dhup Bhog is offered. This Arati is also called as Jaya Mangal Arati. Items are also prepared on request of devotees. The following items are presented for this Bhog.

 Chipuda Pakhala - 14 Oli
 Sana Oli Pakhala - 2 Oli
 Kanar Puli - 3 Oli
 Hata Poda Amalu - 7
 Sana Amalu - 83
 Pani Pakhala - 23 Oli
 Sakara - 5 Oli
 Math Puli - 22
 Bada Amalu - 21

Bada Singhara Bhoga (Late night Meal at 11.00 pm)
This is the last Bhog of the deities. As per the record of rites of Srimandir, the time has been fixed for 11.15 pm. Before Dhup, the Palia Puspalaks dress up the deities with silk dresses (Pata), flower garlands and sing Gita Govinda. The Bhog is performed with 5 Upchars by three members of Puja Pandas by sitting at the side of Ratnabedi. The following items are offered.

 Suar Pitha - 1 Sara
 Rosa Paika - 1 Sara
 Mitha Pakhala - 11
 Kanji - 3 Oli
 Sarapuli Pitha - 5 Sara
 Biri Buha Pitha - 1 Sara
 Kadali Bada - 15
 Payasa/Kshiri - 6 Oli

See also
 Bhoga

References

External links
The food offerings of the Dark Lord

Odia culture
Jagannath